Joseph Cunningham (1877–July 1965) was a unionist politician in Northern Ireland.

Cunningham worked as a shipyard fitter, and was prominent in the local branch of the Amalgamated Society of Engineers.  In 1912, he voted against the union paying a levy to the Labour Party, and was the only delegate to a union conference not to join a protest against the imprisonment of Tom Mann.

In 1921, Cunningham was elected to the first Senate of Northern Ireland as an Ulster Unionist Party member, despite having no political experience.  He became the longest-serving senator, remaining in post until his death in 1965.

References

External links
 

1877 births
1965 deaths
Members of the Senate of Northern Ireland 1921–1925
Members of the Senate of Northern Ireland 1925–1929
Members of the Senate of Northern Ireland 1929–1933
Members of the Senate of Northern Ireland 1933–1937
Members of the Senate of Northern Ireland 1937–1941
Members of the Senate of Northern Ireland 1941–1945
Members of the Senate of Northern Ireland 1945–1949
Members of the Senate of Northern Ireland 1949–1953
Members of the Senate of Northern Ireland 1953–1957
Members of the Senate of Northern Ireland 1957–1961
Members of the Senate of Northern Ireland 1961–1965
Members of the Senate of Northern Ireland 1965–1969
Trade unionists from Northern Ireland
Ulster Unionist Party members of the Senate of Northern Ireland